Maia Emily Bouchier (born 5 December 1998) is an English cricketer who currently plays for Hampshire, Southern Vipers and Southern Brave. She plays as a right-handed batter and bowls occasional right-arm medium pace. She has previously played for Middlesex, Auckland, Melbourne Stars and Western Australia. She made her international debut for the England women's cricket team in September 2021.

Early life
Bouchier was born in Kensington, Greater London. She attended Rugby School and then Oxford Brookes University.

Domestic career

County cricket
Bouchier made her county debut for Middlesex in 2014, against Warwickshire. The 3/24 she took on her debut remains her List A best bowling. She became a regular in the side from 2016, and had her most successful season for Middlesex in 2018: she was their leading run-scorer in the Championship, with 172 runs at 34.40, and was ever-present as her side won the Twenty20 Cup. She also hit what was at the time her List A high score in the Championship, scoring 76 against Somerset.

In 2019, Bouchier moved to Hampshire. She had a successful first season with the club, hitting two half-centuries and ending the season as the side's highest run-scorer in the Twenty20 Cup. In 2021, she scored just 28 runs in four innings in the 2021 Women's Twenty20 Cup. In the 2022 Women's Twenty20 Cup, she was Hampshire's leading run-scorer, with 149 runs including 73 made against Sussex.

Regional cricket
Bouchier also played for Southern Vipers in the Women's Cricket Super League in 2018 and 2019. She played all 11 matches for the side in 2019, helping them reach Finals Day and hitting 114 runs overall, with a best of 40 against Lancashire Thunder. 

Bouchier continued playing for Southern Vipers in the 2020 Rachael Heyhoe Flint Trophy. She appeared in all 7 matches, including her side's 38-run victory in the Final over Northern Diamonds. She scored 183 runs at an average of 30.50, as well as taking 1 wicket, the key dismissal of Lauren Winfield-Hill in the Final. She scored one half-century, 50* in a victory over Western Storm. In October 2020, it was announced that Bouchier had been suspended from bowling due to an illegal elbow extension in her action, and would have to undergo remedial work. She was cleared to resume bowling in competitive cricket in July 2021.

In 2021, Bouchier scored 195 runs at an average of 32.50 in the Rachael Heyhoe Flint Trophy as her side defended their title, as well as scoring 104 runs at an average of 52.00 in the Charlotte Edwards Cup. She also played for Southern Brave in The Hundred, scoring 92 runs with a strike rate of 143.75. In 2022, she was ever-present in Southern Vipers' victorious Charlotte Edwards Cup campaign, scoring 176 runs in seven matches. She also played five matches for the side in the Rachael Heyhoe Flint Trophy, scoring 128 runs including one half-century. In The Hundred, she was ever-present for Southern Brave, scoring 88 runs in 8 matches.

Overseas cricket
Bouchier spent one season, 2017/18, playing for Auckland. She was most successful in the Hallyburton Johnstone Shield, scoring 273 runs at an average of 45.50 with two half-centuries. Her side also won the competition.

In September 2021, Bouchier signed for the Melbourne Stars for the 2021–22 Women's Big Bash League season. She played all 12 matches for the side, scoring 185 runs with a high score of 42, made against Hobart Hurricanes. In February 2022, it was announced that Bouchier had joined Western Australia for their Women's National Cricket League campaign. She played six matches for the side in the tournament, scoring 130 runs including making her List A high score, with 79 against Queensland.

International career
In August 2021, Bouchier was named in England's Women's Twenty20 International (WT20I) squad for their series against New Zealand. However, Bouchier was ruled out of the first WT20I match of the three-match series after being identified as a possible COVID-19 contact. She made her WT20I debut in the next match, on 4 September 2021, for England against New Zealand, scoring 25 from 24 balls. She went on to play the final match of the series as England secured a 2–1 victory. She was later added to the WODI squad ahead of the third match of the series, but was released before the fifth match to enable her to play in the Rachael Heyhoe Flint Trophy final.

In December 2021, Bouchier was named in England's squad for their tour to Australia to contest the Women's Ashes. She appeared in one match on the tour, the first WT20I, but did not bat. In July 2022, she was named in England's squad for their T20I series against South Africa and the cricket tournament at the 2022 Commonwealth Games in Birmingham, England. She played every match across the two series, including making 21* to see England to victory over Sri Lanka in the Commonwealth Games. In December 2022, she played every match in England's T20I series against the West Indies, scoring 31 runs in three innings.

In January 2023, Bouchier was named in England's squad for the 2023 ICC Women's T20 World Cup, although she did not play a match at the tournament.

References

External links

1998 births
Living people
Sportspeople from Kensington
England women Twenty20 International cricketers
Middlesex women cricketers
Hampshire women cricketers
Southern Vipers cricketers
Southern Brave cricketers
Melbourne Stars (WBBL) cricketers
Western Australia women cricketers
Cricketers at the 2022 Commonwealth Games
Commonwealth Games competitors for England